Tamás Pozsgai (born 27 July 1988 in Dunaújváros) is a Hungarian professional ice hockey defenceman who plays for MAC Budapest in the MOL Liga.

External links

1988 births
Living people
Hungarian ice hockey defencemen
People from Dunaújváros